USS Montpelier may refer to:

 , a German freighter initially named  seized in 1917 during World War I
 , a Cleveland-class light cruiser in commission from 1942–1947
 , an active-duty Los Angeles-class submarine commissioned in 1993

United States Navy ship names
Montpelier, Vermont